{{Infobox football club season
|club               = Persija Jakarta
|season             = 2022-23
|image              =
|image_size         = 
|alt                = 
|caption            = 
|chrtitle           = President
|chairman           = Mohamad Prapanca
|ownertitle         = 
|owner              = PT Persija Jaya Jakarta
|mgrtitle           = Manager
|manager            =  Thomas Jens Uwe Doll(since 23 April 2022)
|stdtitle           = 
|stadium            = Jakarta International StadiumPatriot Chandrabhaga StadiumGelora Bung Karno Main Stadium
|league             = Liga 1
|league result      = 3rd|cup1               = 
|cup1 result        = 
|league topscorer   =  Abdulla Yusuf Helal (9)
|season topscorer   =  Abdulla Yusuf Helal (9)
|highest attendance = 27,883(vs Madura United F.C., 18 September 2022, Liga 1)
|lowest attendance  = 0(vs Borneo F.C. Samarinda, 6 December 2022, Liga 1) (vs Persik Kediri, 10 December 2022, Liga 1)(vs Persebaya Surabaya, 16 December 2022, Liga 1)(vs Dewa United F.C., 20 December 2022, Liga 1) (vs PSIS Semarang, 16 March 2023, Liga 1)
|average attendance = 15,566
|largest win        = 0-3(vs RANS Nusantara F.C. (A), 20 August 2022, Liga 1)
|largest loss       = 2–0(vs PSIS Semarang (A), 13 December 2022, Liga 1)
|American           = 
|updated            = 
| pattern_la1 = _persija2223h
| pattern_b1 = _persija2223h
| pattern_ra1 = _persija2223h
| pattern_sh1 = _persija2223h
| pattern_so1 = _persija2223h
| leftarm1 = FC2D3CFF
| body1 = FC2D3CFF
| rightarm1 = FC2D3CFF
| shorts1 = FC2D3CFF
| socks1 = FC2D3CFF
| pattern_la2 = _persija2223a
| pattern_b2 = _persija2223a
| pattern_ra2 = _persija2223a
| pattern_sh2 = _persija2223a
| pattern_so2 = _persija2223a
| leftarm2          = FFFFF0
| body2             = FFFFF0
| rightarm2         = FFFFF0
| shorts2           = FFFFF0
| socks2            = FFFFF0
| pattern_la3 = _persija2223t
| pattern_b3 = _persija2223t
| pattern_ra3 = _persija2223t
| pattern_sh3 = _persija2223t
| pattern_so3 = _persija2223t
| leftarm3 = 232326FF
| body3 = 232326FF
| rightarm3 = 232326FF
| shorts3 = 232326FF
| socks3 = 232326FF
|prevseason         = 2021-22
|nextseason         = 2023–24
}}

The 2022-23  season is Persija's 89th competitive season. They have not been relegated since the Perserikatan competition started in 1933. This season is Persija's 28th consecutive seasons in top-flight since professional competition formed on 1994. The season covers the period from 1 June 2022 to 31 May 2023.

Coaching staff

Management

|-

 
|}

New contracts

Transfers

In

First round

Second round

Out

First round

Second round

Loan In

Loan Out

Squad information

First team squad

Pre-season

Friendly Matches

2022 Indonesia President's Cup

Group stage

Competitions

 Overview 

Top scorersThe list is sorted by shirt number when total goals are equal.Top assistThe list is sorted by shirt number when total assists are equal.Clean sheetsThe list is sorted by shirt number when total clean sheets are equal.''

Disciplinary record
Includes all competitive matches. Players listed below made at least one appearance for Persija Jakarta first squad during the season.

Last updated:  
Source: Competitions 
Only competitive matches 
 = Number of bookings;  = Number of sending offs after a second yellow card;  = Number of sending offs by a direct red card.

Summary

Notes

References

Persija Jakarta
Persija Jakarta seasons